Mark Tieku, better known by his stage name Tieks (often stylised as TIEKS) is an English record producer and songwriter from London. He is best known for his 2016 single "Sunshine", featuring vocals from Dan Harkna, which peaked at number 15 on the UK Singles Chart.

Career

2014–present 
On 9 September 2014, he released his debut single "Sing That Song", featuring vocals from Celeste. The song peaked at number 90 on the UK Singles Chart and Scottish Singles Chart. On 9 October 2015, he released the single "Sunshine", featuring vocals from Dan Harkna. The song peaked at number 15 on the UK Singles Chart and number 9 on the Scottish Singles Chart.

Discography

Singles

References

Year of birth missing (living people)
Living people
English record producers
English male singer-songwriters